Kanika Mann (born 7 October 1993) is an Indian actress who primarily works in Hindi television and Punjabi films. She made her acting debut with the Punjabi film Rocky Mental (2017) and made her television debut with Badho Bahu (2018) portraying Titli. Mann is best known for her dual portrayal of Guddan Jindal and Guddan Birla in Guddan Tumse Na Ho Payega.

Mann made her web debut with MX Player's Roohaniyat. She was also a finalist in Khatron Ke Khiladi 12.

Early life
Mann was born on 7 October 1993 in Panipat, Haryana. She completed her graduation from Panjab University, Chandigarh.

Career
Mann started her career as a model and later appeared in various Punjabi music videos. She made her acting debut in 2017 with the Punjabi film Rocky Mental portraying Seerat opposite Dheeraj Kumar. The film received positive reviews.

In 2018, she made her Kannada film debut with Brihaspathi. The film received mixed reviews. She then appeared in the Punjabi film Daana Paani portraying Maghi. Mann made her television debut in 2018 with Badho Bahu, where she portrayed Titli opposite Prince Narula.

From 2018 to 2020, Mann portrayed Guddan Gupta Jindal in Guddan Tumse Na Ho Payega opposite Nishant Singh Malkani, which proved as a major turning point in her career. She portrayed her character's on-screen daughter Guddan Jindal Birla opposite Savi Thakur from 2020 to 2021.

In 2021, she appeared in the Punjabi film Amrika My Dream opposite Amandep Multani and Sapinder Shergill. 

Mann made her web debut in March 2022, with MX Player's Roohaniyat opposite Arjun Bijlani portraying Prisha Srivastava. She also portrayed Manpreet/ Miss Maahi in the 2022 Punjabi film Majajan Orchestra.

In July 2022, she was seen as a finalist on Khatron Ke Khiladi 12. In July 2022, she also reprised her role of Prisha Srivastava in the second season of Roohaniyat opposite Arjun Bijlani.

Filmography

Television

Special appearances

Web series

Music videos

Awards

References

External links

 

1993 births
Living people
Indian actresses